Young the Giant is an American rock band that formed in Irvine, California, in 2004. The band's line-up consists of Sameer Gadhia (lead vocals), Jacob Tilley (guitar), Eric Cannata (guitar), Payam Doostzadeh (bass guitar), and Francois Comtois (drums). Formerly known as The Jakes, Young the Giant was signed by Roadrunner Records in 2009, and they released their eponymous debut album in 2010. The band's first three singles, "My Body", "Cough Syrup", and "Apartment", all charted on the US Alternative Songs chart.

History

Formation (2004–2009)
The Jakes formed in 2004 in Irvine, California. Consisting of Jacob Tilley, Addam Farmer, Kevin Massoudi, Ehson Hashemian, and Sameer Gadhia, the band's name was an acronym of the members' first names. After several personnel changes, the group's lineup by 2008 included Gadhia (born July 10, 1989), Tilley, Hashemian, Eric Cannata, Francois Comtois (born May 20, 1988), and Jason Burger. Initial coordination of musical contributions was difficult because the members all attended different schools. With two members still in high school and the others each attending different colleges, the Jakes recorded an EP, Shake My Hand, with producer Ian Kirkpatrick. Band members then individually decided whether or not to put their schooling on hold to focus on music. Burger left the band to pursue an education at Manhattan School of Music in New York City, and Comtois took over as the drummer. Shortly thereafter, longtime friend and collaborator Payam Doostzadeh joined as bassist. In 2009, the band played four shows at the South by Southwest music festival in Austin, Texas. The band's song "Texas Tea" was played during an episode of MTV's The Real World: Brooklyn, and "Paid the Piper" was featured on A&E's The Beast. Another song, "Cough Syrup", received airplay on the Los Angeles radio station KROQ. Shortly before signing to Roadrunner Records in August, keyboardist Ehson Hashemian left the band. In December 2009, the band announced they had changed their name to Young the Giant.

Young the Giant (2010–2013)
 
The Jakes officially changed their name to Young the Giant in January 2010 during the production of their eponymous album. Young the Giant spent 2010 opening for Minus the Bear and Steel Train while working on their debut album with Joe Chiccarelli at Sunset Sound Studios in Los Angeles. They took an old-school approach to recording the album. All the tracks were performed live which resulted in a lot of “chopping” during production. The band was very vigilant of their tracks but trusted the decisions of Joe Chiccarelli who had previously produced albums for The Shins, The Strokes, and Saints of Valory. The band believed in transparency; they only wanted to record what they could reproduce in front of an audience at a live show.

After the band finished recording in early June, they played additional shows with Marina and the Diamonds, The Futureheads, Neon Trees, and New Politics. Several songs—including "My Body", "I Got", and "Strings"—were leaked online in advance of the album's release. On October 26, Roadrunner Records digitally released the eponymous Young the Giant album, which Amazon.com hailed the third best rock album of 2010. The album was released physically in the U.S. on January 25, 2011  and in the UK on May 2.

The band's first single "My Body" was released to U.S. radio in January and went on to peak at number five on the Billboard Alternative Songs chart. iTunes offered the song as a weekly free download beginning January 9, and it was featured on an episode of American Idol. The band performed the song that month on ABC's Jimmy Kimmel Live! and Fuel TV's The Daily Habit. The official video for the single, which features actor Bryan James, was directed by Justin Francis.

In March, Young the Giant headlined the Billboard Showcase at South by Southwest in Austin, Texas. In May, the band played the Sasquatch! Music Festival, the BBC's Later... with Jools Holland, and The Great Escape Festival in Brighton. English singer Morrissey, on the fansite True to You, declared Young The Giant as one of his favorite new bands. The music video for the group's second single, "Cough Syrup", premiered in June. The band was named MTV's PUSH Artist of the Week on July 4.

An extended play (EP) featuring remixes by such artists as Two Door Cinema Club, Tokyo Police Club, and Ra Ra Riot was made available in September for free through Young the Giant's Facebook page. Fans were invited to create their own remixes with the opportunity for their entry to be featured on the EP. In August, the band played on the main stage at Lollapalooza.

Young the Giant performed during the 2011 MTV Video Music Awards on August 28. The band began a tour with Incubus two days later. 
The exposure from the VMA performance propelled Young the Giant onto the Billboard 200 albums chart, where it eventually peaked at number 42. 
Sales for "My Body" climbed 220 percent on iTunes, helping the single reach number 65 on the Billboard Hot 100 chart. Young the Giant played at the Austin City Limits Music Festival in September, and a month later they performed songs from their debut album for an episode of MTV Unplugged which debuted online in November.

"Apartment", the band's third single, was released in February 2011 and peaked at number 26 on the US Alternative Songs chart. 
The music video for the song premiered in April 2012. 
The group performed "Apartment" and "Cough Syrup" on a May episode of NBC's Today, and CNN Newsroom profiled the band a month later.

The band released a music video for non-album track "West Virginia" in January 2012 and started their first major headlining tour in February. 
They also headlined mtvU's first-ever Woodies Tour which began later that month. 
Darren Criss' character Blaine Anderson covered "Cough Syrup" on the season three episode of Glee titled "On My Way". The song featured during the attempted suicide scene with Max Adler's character Dave Karofsky.

In October 2020, the band announced the celebration of their ten-year anniversary of their self-titled album with a virtual concert, a special digital release, and a new vinyl release.

Mind over Matter (2013–2015)
On October 28, 2013, Young the Giant released "It's About Time", the lead single from the band's second album, Mind over Matter. On December 9, 2013, Young the Giant also released "Crystallized", another single from the band's second album. The album was released on January 21, 2014 via Fueled by Ramen. The band enlisted Grammy-nominated producer Justin Meldal-Johnsen to produce the album for the Southern California group.

The New York Times called the album "a sharp, electric album that has the cool reserve of the Cure matched with the arena mind-set of, say, Muse (though without that group’s mechanical air)."

The next fall the band embarked on a North American Tour starting in South Burlington, Vermont, and ending in Boulder, Colorado. The band was opened by the band Wildling who Gadhia helped in their search for a drummer.
Following the release of their second album, the group released another set of videos for their In the Open series on YouTube.

In 2015, the band released two songs named "Mirrorball" and "Mind Over Matter (Reprise)" exclusively on vinyl for Record Store Day of that year. The songs were later released online July 28, 2017.

Home of the Strange (2016–2017)
On April 15, 2016, the band released a new track, "Amerika", taken from their third studio album, Home of the Strange, released on August 12, 2016. The first official single on the record is "Something to Believe In", which was sent to alternative radio on May 10, 2016. Another track from the album, "Titus Was Born", was released with an accompanying music video on June 17, 2016.
Young the Giant's tour for the album began August 13, 2016, starting from the west coast of the United States. Two additional tracks from the album, "Jungle Youth" and "Silvertongue", were released in the weeks before the release of the album.

Mirror Master (2018)
The band released the first single, "Simplify", from their upcoming album on June 14, 2018. The album's second single, "Superposition", was released on August 23, 2018, along with an announcement that Mirror Master would be released on October 12, 2018, by Elektra Records. The band released the third single, "Heat of the Summer", on September 21, 2018. "Call Me Back", the fourth single and last before the album's release, was released on October 5, 2018.

American Bollywood (2022–present)
The band released the single, “Wake Up”, on June 15, 2022. Other songs from the first act of their American Bollywood album, named "Act I: Origins", were released on July 15, 2022. The band also premiered a video for the album's title song, "American Bollywood", on YouTube on July 15, 2022. The three other acts were named, "Act II: Exile", "Act III: Battle", and "Act IV: Denouement". A total of sixteen songs were released on the American Bollywood album in the form of the four separate acts with four songs each, and the songs were released as a full album on November 16, 2022. The American Bollywood tour began on October 12, 2022 at the Red Rocks Amphitheatre in Morrison, Colorado.

Band members
Current members
Sameer Gadhia – lead vocals, percussion, keyboards, guitar (since 2004)
Gadhia was born in Ann Arbor, Michigan, and grew up in Irvine, California. He comes from a family of musicians, especially Indian Classical. His sister, mother, and grandmother are singers. He began exploring a variety of American styles of music early on. He majored in Human Biology at Stanford University where he was involved in an a cappella group, Talisman, and in Greek life, as a brother of Sigma Nu. In 2009, he put a halt to school and pursuing medicine to give his musical aspirations a shot. He does plan on going back to complete his degree someday. He shares a house in Los Angeles with his bandmates when not on the road. 
Jacob Tilley – guitar, synthesizer, mellotron (since 2004)
Eric Cannata – guitar, vocals, keyboards (since 2007)
Payam Doostzadeh – bass guitar, synthesizer, vocals (since 2008)
Francois Comtois – drums, percussion, vocals, (since 2007); bass guitar (2004–2007)

Former members (The Jakes)
Ehson Hashemian – keyboards, piano, synthesizers (2004–2009)
Jason Burger – drums (2007)
Sean Fischer – drums (2004–2007)

Discography

Studio albums

Extended plays

Singles

Music videos

Notes

References

External links

 
 
 Young the Giant at Roadrunner Records
 Young the Giant Live Session in the Virgin Red Room

Alternative rock groups from California
Fueled by Ramen artists
Musical groups from Orange County, California
Musical groups established in 2004
Musical quintets
Roadrunner Records artists
2004 establishments in California